Maryland Route 242 (MD 242) is a state highway in the U.S. state of Maryland.  Known as Colton Point Road, the state highway runs  from Coltons Point north to MD 5 in Morganza.  MD 242 connects the communities of Morganza, Clements, Bushwood, Avenue, and Coltons Point in western St. Mary's County.  The state highway also leads to St. Clement's Island State Park, the site of Maryland's First Landing.  MD 242 was constructed in the early 1920s.

Route description

MD 242 begins at the intersection of Beach Road and Point Breeze Road in a residential neighborhood at Coltons Point on the shore of the Potomac River.  Point Breeze Road heads east toward the St. Clements Island–Potomac River Museum, which is the embarkation point for seasonal boat tours to St. Clement's Island State Park, the site of Maryland's First Landing that includes the Blakistone Island Light.  MD 242 heads northwest as a two-lane undivided road through a mix of farmland and forest and scattered residences along the parallel St. Patrick's Creek.  The state highway veers north through the community of Avenue, where the highway intersects the southern end of MD 470 (Oakley Road) and the western end of Abell Road.  MD 242 continues northwest through a forested area and turns north again at MD 239 (Bushwood Wharf Road) near the community of Bushwood.  The state highway veers northeast and intersects MD 238 (Maddox Road) in the hamlet of Milestown before crossing Tomakokin Creek.  MD 242 meets the northern end of MD 470 (Oakley Road) just south of the hamlet of Dynard.  The state highway crosses Dynard Run and parallels St. Clements Creek before arriving in the community of Clements, where the highway comes to a roundabout with MD 234 (Budds Creek Road), which connects Leonardtown to the east with U.S. Route 301 and the Governor Harry W. Nice Memorial Bridge to the west. A park and ride lot is located at the northwest corner of this roundabout. MD 242 leaves Clements heading north then curves to the east and crosses St. Clements Creek.  The state highway heads northeast through farmland, crossing Locust Run before passing west of Chopticon High School.  MD 242 reaches its northern terminus at MD 5 (Point Lookout Road) in the community of Morganza.  The highway continues north as county-maintained Morganza–Turner Road.

History
MD 242 was constructed as a gravel road from Morganza to Avenue by 1921 and completed to Coltons Point in 1923.  The state highway was reconstructed with curve modifications and a bituminous-stabilized gravel surface in the 1950s, beginning with the Morganza–Clements section in 1949 and 1950.  MD 242 was rebuilt from Clements to Bushwood by 1959.

Junction list

See also

References

External links

MDRoads: MD 242

242
Maryland Route 242